Patrick Bauer (born 28 October 1992) is a German professional footballer who plays as a centre back for Preston North End.

Club career
In May 2011 Bauer extended his contract with VfB Stuttgart until June 2015. On 29 July 2011, he had his debut for the first team of VfB Stuttgart in the first round of the 2011–12 DFB-Pokal against SV Wehen Wiesbaden.

On 17 August 2012, Bauer was loaned out to C.S. Marítimo until the end of the 2012–13 season. On 26 August 2012, he made his debut for C.S. Marítimo B in the Segunda Liga against Vitória S.C. B. Six days later, he scored his first goal in the Segunda Liga against Sporting B. On 24 July 2013, Bauer signed a three-year contract with Marítimo.

On 22 June 2015, Bauer became Charlton Athletic's first signing of the summer by putting pen to paper on a four-year contract with the Championship side.
He made his Charlton Athletic debut against QPR on 8 August 2015. On 12 September, he scored his first goal for the club in a 1–1 draw with Rotherham United.

On 26 May 2019, Bauer scored the winning goal for Charlton in the 94th minute of the 2019 EFL League One play-off Final against Sunderland at Wembley Stadium.

He was offered a new contract by Charlton at the end of the 2018–19 season, but instead decided to sign a three-year deal with Championship side Preston North End.

International career
Bauer has been capped for Germany national youth teams ten times in total.

Personal life
Bauer and his wife had their first child, a daughter, in May 2019.

Career statistics

Club

Honours
Charlton Athletic
EFL League One play-offs: 2019

References

External links
 Profile at lpfp.pt 
 
 Profile at kicker.de 

1992 births
Living people
People from Backnang
Sportspeople from Stuttgart (region)
German footballers
Germany youth international footballers
Association football defenders
Footballers from Baden-Württemberg
3. Liga players
Primeira Liga players
VfB Stuttgart players
VfB Stuttgart II players
C.S. Marítimo players
Charlton Athletic F.C. players
Preston North End F.C. players
German expatriate footballers
Expatriate footballers in Portugal
German expatriate sportspeople in Portugal
Expatriate footballers in England
English Football League players
German expatriate sportspeople in England